Beyranvand-e Jonubi Rural District is a rural district (dehestan) in Bayravand District, Khorramabad County, Lorestan Province, Iran. At the 2006 census, its population was 6,309, in 1,359 families.  The rural district has 64 villages.

References 

Rural Districts of Lorestan Province
Khorramabad County